Mesopotamia, sometimes abbreviated as Mesop, is an electoral constituency in the Belize District represented in the House of Representatives of the National Assembly of Belize since 2020 by Shyne Barrow of the United Democratic Party.

Profile

The Mesopotamia constituency was created for the 1961 general election as part of a major nationwide redistricting. It currently comprises much of central Belize City, surrounded by the Collet, Queen's Square and Albert constituencies. The UDP has continuously held Mesopotamia since the 1979 general election, longer than any other constituency. It is widely considered a strong UDP safe seat.

Longtime representative Michael Finnegan stood down at the 2020 general election and was succeeded by his nephew, internationally-known rapper Shyne Barrow.

Area Representatives

Elections

References

Political divisions in Belize
British Honduras Legislative Assembly constituencies established in 1961
1961 establishments in British Honduras
Mesopotamia (Belize House constituency)